Trent's Last Case is a 1929 American Pre-Code detective film directed by Howard Hawks and starring Raymond Griffith, Marceline Day, Raymond Hatton, and Donald Crisp. It was released by Fox Film Corporation. The film was released in a silent version and a sound version, with the sound version having talking sequences, a synchronized music score, and sound effects.

The film is based on the 1913 novel Trent's Last Case by British writer E. C. Bentley. A previous version starring Clive Brook was filmed in the UK in 1920 and released by Stoll Film Company.

Premise
A leading financier is found dead at his home, leading amateur detective Philip Trent to investigate the case.

Cast
 Raymond Griffith as Philip Trent
 Marceline Day as Evelyn Manderson
 Raymond Hatton as Joshua Cupples
 Donald Crisp as Sigsbee Manderson
 Lawrence Gray as Jack Marlowe
 Nicholas Soussanin as Martin
 Anita Garvin as Ottilie Dunois
 Edgar Kennedy as Inspector Murch

Preservation status
According to Silent Era, a print exists. An incomplete print is held by the Library of Congress.

See also
 Trent's Last Case (1952)

References

External links
Trent's Last Case at IMDB
Trent's Last Case at SilentEra

1929 films
American detective films
1920s English-language films
Films directed by Howard Hawks
1929 crime films
American black-and-white films
Fox Film films
Films based on British novels
Films based on mystery novels
American remakes of British films
Sound film remakes of silent films
Transitional sound films
American crime films
Films based on works by Edmund Clerihew Bentley
1920s American films